The Judo competition at the 1972 Summer Olympics was the return of the sport following its absence at the 1968 Summer Olympics in Mexico City. Medals were awarded in six weight classes, and competition was restricted to men only. Among the highlights was Wim Ruska of the Netherlands winning gold medals in both the heavyweight and open class competition, becoming the first judoka to win two Olympic gold medals.

Medal summary

Medal table

Participating countries

References

External links
 
 
 Sports123.com
 Videos of the 1972 Judo Summer Olympics

 
1972 Summer Olympics events
O
1972
Judo competitions in Mexico